Aphaenops jauzioni is a species of beetle in the subfamily Trechinae. It was described by Faille, Deliot & Queinnec in 2007.

References

jauzioni
Beetles described in 2007